Ida Rentoul Outhwaite, also known as  Ida Sherbourne Rentoul and Ida Sherbourne Outhwaite (9 June 1888 – 25 June 1960), was an Australian illustrator of children's books. Her work mostly depicted magical creatures, such as elves and fairies.

Early life 
Ida Rentoul was born in Carlton, Victoria, the youngest child of four and second daughter of the Rev. John Laurence Rentoul, an Irish-born Presbyterian minister and academic, and his wife Annie Isobel (née Rattray). At the time of her birth, her father was a professor at Ormond College, University of Melbourne, and later moderator-general of his church between 1912 and 1914. When World War I broke out, he became chaplain-general of the First Australian Imperial Force.

She was educated at Presbyterian Ladies' College, Melbourne. After she married Arthur Grenbry Outhwaite on 8 December 1909, she was generally known as Ida Rentoul Outhwaite. Before this, she had variously signed her work I.S.R. and at some point changed this to I.R.O. She also occasionally used I.S.R.O. and full spellings rather than abbreviations.

Career 
Outhwaite worked predominantly with pen and ink, and watercolour. Her first illustration was published by New Idea magazine in 1903 when she was just 15 years of age – it accompanied a story written by her older sister, Annie Rattray Rentoul. In the years that followed, the sisters collaborated on a number of stories.

Following her marriage, she also collaborated with her husband – most notably for The Enchanted Forest (1921), The Little Fairy Sister (1923) and Fairyland (1926). In a number of cases, her children – Robert, Anne, Wendy and William – served as models for her illustrations.

Works 
Publications carrying her illustrations include:
 The Fairies of Fern Gully (1903)
 Mollie's Bunyip (1904)
 Mollie's Staircase (1906)
 Gum Tree Brownie and other Faerie Folk of the Never Never (1907)
 Before the Lamps are Lit (1911)
 Elves and Fairies (1916)
 The Enchanted Forest (1921)
 The Little Green Road to Fairyland (1922)
 The Little Fairy Sister (1923)
 The Sentry and the Shell Fairy (1924)
 Fairyland (1926)
 Blossom: A Fairy Story (1928)
 Bunny and Brownie: The Adventures of George and Wiggle (1930)
 A Bunch of Wild Flowers (1933)
Sixpence to Spend (1935)
Australian Bush Songs (1936)
The Lost Princess (1937)
A Bunch of Wild Flowers (1942)
Musical Nursery Rhymes (1945)
The Puddin' and the Pixie and other songs (1949)
The Guinea Pig that wanted a Tail (1951)
Legends of the Outback (1958) by Phyllis Power

Her works (including advertising images) were also published in periodicals and newspapers such as The New Idea, The Native Companion, Australia Today, and the British-Australasian.

Her illustrations were exhibited throughout Australia, as well as in London and Paris between 1907 and 1933.

Legacy 
She died in Australia at Caulfield, Victoria in 1960.

In her lifetime, she  inspired a number of artists including Edith Alsop, Ethel Spowers, and Ethel Jackson Morris.

Her work is depicted in four stained glass windows in an adjoining hall at St Mark's Anglican Church in Fitzroy, Victoria.

In 1985 she was honoured on a postage stamp, depicting an illustration from Elves and Fairies, issued by Australia Post.

References

External links 

 Ida Rentoul Outhwaite (1888–1960) at Ortakales.com/illustrators [Women Children's Books Illustrators]
 Ida Rentoul Outhwaite – Queen of Fairyland (gallery)
 A Chronological Bibliography, compiled by Michael Organ and others
 

1888 births
1960 deaths
Australian illustrators
Artists from Melbourne
Fantasy artists
People educated at the Presbyterian Ladies' College, Melbourne
20th-century illustrators of fairy tales
Australian children's book illustrators
Australian women illustrators
People from Carlton, Victoria
Australian people of Irish descent
Australian people of Ulster-Scottish descent